Thermosara is a genus of moths of the family Erebidae. The genus was erected by George Hampson in 1926. Both species are found in New Guinea.

Species
Thermosara diapyra Hampson, 1926
Thermosara flavipuncta Hampson, 1926

References

Calpinae